Afemata Palusalue Faapo II (born ~1956) is a Samoan politician and former Cabinet Minister.  From 2011 to 2016 he was the leader of the opposition Tautua Samoa Party.

Palusalue was first elected to Parliament in 1996.  He served as Parliamentary Undersecretary to the Minister of Justice.  After being re-elected in 2001, he was appointed to Cabinet, first as Minister of Transport and Civil Aviation, and then as Minister of Communication & Information Technology.  After the 2006 election he became associate Minister of Finance.

Palusalue left the governing Human Rights Protection Party in March 2008 and joined the opposition as an independent MP.  He later became a founding member of the Tautua Samoa Party. As a result, in May 2009 he was one of nine Tautua MPs declared to have resigned their seats under an anti-party hopping law.  He was subsequently reinstated after the Supreme Court of Samoa overturned the law and declared the formation of new parties legal.

In January 2010 new anti-party-hopping laws came into force, barring MPs from declaring their support for political parties or organizations with political aims other than the party they were elected for.  As a result, along with Lealailepule Rimoni Aiafi and Va'ai Papu Vailupe he was deemed to have resigned his seat.  He was re-elected in the resulting by-election. In December 2010 he was elected deputy leader of Tautua. He was re-elected in the 2011 election and re-elected deputy leader. Following Va'ai Papu Vailupe's loss of his seat for bribery and treating he became party leader. He lost his seat in the 2016 election.

In 2017 he was conferred with the chiefly title of Afemata.

He contested the 2021 election as a candidate for the Faatuatua i le Atua Samoa ua Tasi (FAST) party but was unsuccessful.

In February 2023, the FAST government appointed Palusalue to serve as Samoa's consul-general in Auckland, New Zealand.

References

|-

|-

|-

Year of birth missing (living people)
Living people
Members of the Legislative Assembly of Samoa
Communication ministers of Samoa
Transport ministers of Samoa
Tautua Samoa Party politicians
Human Rights Protection Party politicians
Faʻatuatua i le Atua Samoa ua Tasi politicians